The Overture ( or Hom rong) is a 2004 Thai tragic-nostalgia music-drama film. A fictionalised account based on the life story of Thai palace musician Luang Pradit Phairoh (Sorn Silapabanleng), it follows the life of a Thai classical musician from the late 19th century to the 1940s. The film was the winner of several awards in Thailand and was the country's official selection for the Academy Award for Best Foreign Language Film. It was directed by Itthisoontorn Vichailak and producers included Nonzee Nimibutr and Chatrichalerm Yukol. The film was also credited with a revival in the popularity of piphat – Thai classical music. In 2015, this film had been remade into a musical play from the 4th of April to 17 May at KBank Siam Pic-Ganesha Theatre.

Plot

Starting out in the 1940s, the story finds the elder Sorn bed-ridden. To an old friend, he recalls his childhood growing up in 1880s Siam, during the reign of King Chulalongkorn and the action flashes back to that time.

Sorn's brother was a gifted classical musician, so gifted in fact that it caused a rivalry with other musicians that ended in Sorn's brother's death. Because of that, Sorn's father bars the boy from taking up the ranat ek (Thai xylophone). However, Sorn, who has shown a talent for the instrument since an early age, defies his father and sneaks off to practice playing in an abandoned temple in the jungle.

Eventually, he becomes so skilled at the instrument that his father lets him play after he speaks to a monk who advises him that he should not deny him the right to play ranad-ek. Sorn excels in his studies to the point where he is noticed by other bands. They ask for his presence to complete. He becomes arrogant and misses practice telling his father that his faith isn't misplaced. His father teaches his place by putting him on the Kong-wong. At the competition, the competitor scares his uncle (the substitute on ranad-ek) and becomes clear that the competitor has superior skill. As their playing, the judge realises that Sorn isn't playing on the ranad-ek and calls the teacher out on the fact that if they have a good player, might as well bring out the good material because then you can lose with  dignity. The band starts over and plays the same song, but Sorn is skilled. He wins every competition as a boy. So  One day, in a local village, Sorn and his ensemble are set up to perform in a courtyard. Across the courtyard is another ensemble, led by a fierce-looking bearded ranad-ek player dressed in black. As the rival player starts to perform, a storm whips up adding to the ominous mood of the setting. Sorn is disturbed by his fiery ability to play and wants to learn like him.

But Sorn's talent does not go unnoticed and he is soon chosen to play for a local nobleman and is sent to the palace for more formal music training. There he meets an older man that he thinks is a palace caretaker, or some type of lowly person that does not know about music. However, later, when Sorn is to meet his new teacher, Master Tian, it is revealed to be the old man he met earlier. Tian turns out to be a strict teacher and instructs Sorn on all the instruments of the Thai classical music ensemble. At one point, Sorn is punished for being too flashy a player and is made to relinquish the ranad-ek to an inferior player, much to the dismay of other members in his ensemble, as well as a high palace official watching the performance.

So when it comes time for the kingdom's musical competition, it is Sorn who is again the lead player. However, Sorn must overcome his fear at the competition, because he must again face the fierce, bearded ranad-ek performer.

The story flashes back forward to the 1940s again, showing Sorn as a respected teacher. One day Sorn's son has a piano moved into his father's studio. The expectation is that his father will be furious at having a newfangled Western instrument brought into his house. But instead of being mad, he instructs his son to play a tune on the piano. The elder Sorn then takes up his ranad-ek mallets and improvises with his son, blending Thai and Western music.

This is during the rule of the dictator, Field Marshal Plaek Pibulsonggram, whose government called for the accelerated modernisation of Thailand. As a result, performances of traditional Thai music, dance and theatre were frowned upon. In Sorn's neighbourhood, the orders are enforced by Lieutenant-Colonel Veera.

Sorn teaches the Lieutenant a nation can only withstand outside forces if their nation is strong. For that to happen, they must believe in themselves. No matter what, they must protect their heritage and honor it regardless of what they are to become. Sorn plays not only to defy the rules, but to teach a lesson about culture and heritage.

Cast
 Anuchyd Sapanphong as younger Sorn 
 Adul Dulyarat as elderly Sorn
 Pongpat Wachirabunjong as Lt Col Veera 
 Narongrit Tosa-nga as Khun In 
 Phoovarit Phumpuang as Terd 
 Somlek Sakdikul as Master Tian

Cast for Musical
 Kornkan Sutthikoses as younger Sorn
 Sathida Prompiriya as younger Chote

Reception
After a poor showing at the box office on opening weekend, The Overture was pulled from many theaters. However, after word of mouth spread and discussions flourished on Internet forums such as Pantip.com, the film was brought back and become a sensation that won numerous awards and sparked renewed interest in Thai classical music. Captivated by the film's nationalistic, historical and cultural themes, the film was embraced by Royal Family and the Thai government, which used it as a promotional tool. It was one of the most popular Thai films of 2004.

Awards
In addition to being named as Thailand's official selection for Best Foreign Language Film for the 77th Academy Awards, The Overture collected dozens of awards in Thailand. They include:
 2004 Thailand National Film Association Awards
 Best Picture
 Best Director
 Best Supporting Actor (Adul Dulyarat) 
 Best Cinematography (Nattawut Kittikhun)
 Best Editing (Itthisoontorn Vichailak)
 Best Screenplay (Itthisoontorn Vichailak, Peerasak Saksiri, Dolkamol Sattatip)
 Best Sound
 2004 Bangkok Critics Assembly Awards
 Best Picture
 Best Director
 Best Supporting Actor (Pongpat Wachirabanjong)
 Best Film Editing
 Best Music
 2004 Star Entertainment Award
 Best Picture
 Best Director
 Best Supporting Actor (Adul Dulyarat)
 Best Film Editing
 Best Screenplay
 Best Sound Recording
 Best Music

Film festivals
The Overture was screened at many film festivals in 2004 and 2005. They include:
 Toronto International Film Festival
 Vancouver International Film Festival 
 Pusan International Film Festival 
 London Film Festival 
 Miami International Film Festival 
 Seattle International Film Festival

Soundtrack

The original score was composed by Chatchai Pongprapaphan, with Thai classical music performed by Chaibhuk Bhutrachinda, the Korphai Ensemble and Narongrit Tosa-nga.

Narongrit, who portrayed Khun-In in the film, is a professional musician and a gifted player of the ranad-ek (Thai xylophone) and actually performed his own ranad-ek parts in the film.

The Overture won Best Music at the Star Entertainment Awards 2004 and Bangkok Critics Assembly Awards.

A soundtrack album was produced by Itthisoontorn Vichailak and released in 2004, but has since gone out of print.

Track listing
"Assajun" ("อัศจรรย์", or "Miracle", composed by Petch Marr and Pijika) – 4:40
"Kaek bor-ra-tes" ("แขกบรเทศ") – 0:53
"Ton worrachet" ("ต้นวรเชษฐ์") – 1:35
"Kum warn" ("คำหวาน") – 1:34
"Kra-tai ten" ("กระต่ายเต้น") – 1:18
"Lao duang duen" ("ลาวดวงเดือน") – 1:10
"Hom rong pra-derm chai" ("โหมโรงประเดิมชัย") – 1:39
"Hom rong um-ma-baht" ("โหมโรงอัฐมบาท") – 1:37
"Hom rong chor paka" ("โหมโรงช่อผกา") – 1:22
"Home rong jeen tok mai" ("โหมโรงจีนตอกไม้") – 1:55
"Saen kum-nueng" ("แสนคำนึง") – 3:11
Tracks 2-11 traditional Thai music performed by Chaibhuk Bhutrachinda, Korphai and Narongrit Tosa-nga
"Raek phob" ("แรกพบ") – 2:12
"Terd toh" ("เติบโต") – 2:38
"Berk barn" ("เบิกบาน") – 0:50
"Sum nuek" ("สำนึก") – 1:10
"Chai-cha-na" ("ชัยชนะ") – 2:10
"Kwam wung" ("ความหวัง") – 2:23
Tracks 12-17 are cues from the original score by Chatchai Pongrapaphan

See also
 Music of Thailand
Traditional Thai musical instruments
Ranat ek musical instrument

References

External links
 
 
 
 Official page at Kino International
 Official page at Cinemasia

2004 films
Thai-language films
2000s musical drama films
Films set in the 1880s
Films set in the 1940s
Sahamongkol Film International films
Thai biographical films
Best Picture Suphannahong National Film Award winners
Thai national heritage films
2000s biographical films
2004 drama films